127 Hours: Music from the Motion Picture is the soundtrack to Danny Boyle's 2010 film of the same name. It was composed by  Academy Award Winner A. R. Rahman, Boyle's previous collaborator on Slumdog Millionaire. The score, centred on guitar, was recorded mainly in London and was completed in three weeks. The soundtrack was released digitally on 2 November and physically on 22 November, by Interscope Records and Fox Music. The score is briefly orchestral and the song's main theme, "If I Rise" features Rahman playing the Harpejji.

The soundtrack album includes original score and the theme song composed by Rahman, the tracks "Never Hear Surf Music Again" by Free Blood, "Lovely Day" by Bill Withers, Frédéric Chopin's Nocturne No.2 in E flat, Op.9 No.2, "Ça plane pour moi" by Plastic Bertrand, "If You Love Me" by Esther Phillips, and "Festival" by Sigur Rós. The original theme song of the film, "If I Rise", is written by A. R. Rahman (music), Dido and Rollo Armstrong (lyrics) and performed by Dido along with Rahman. It was featured in the climax scene of the film.

The film's subject Aron Ralston's favourite band, Phish, is mentioned in the film. During production, Boyle asked Ralston how Phish lyrics could be included in the film. Ralston sings lines from the Phish song "Sleeping Monkey" when swimming in one of the early scenes of the movie. But the soundtrack album did not feature this song. Another song "The Funeral" from Band of Horses is not in the soundtrack album, but is used in the end of the trailer.

Development
Rahman collaborated with Danny Boyle for the second time. Their previous association, Slumdog Millionaire was a great critical and commercial success to Rahman, who was described by Time magazine as India's most prominent movie songwriter, in 2005. After the scripting finished, Boyle handed over the script to Rahman, who says when he first got the script and the screenplay, even before the shoot, some kind of sounds came into his mind and he put some stuff down and sent it to Boyle when he was cutting the movie. Rahman wanted the score to feel very much like something the cinematic Ralston might be listening to, a mix of heavily layered acoustic and electric guitars, brightened with digital effects. About the selection of guitar as the major instrument, Rahman says:

Rahman says that he was able to complete the score within a short period of three to four weeks. After completing the score, when asked about the scoring experience and challenges, Rahman said:

Reception

The soundtrack received generally favourable critical reviews. Philip French of The Observer commented that "The music is subtly varied; the soundtrack makes admirable use of silence and natural sound."

Sarah Kurchak of ChartAttack reviewed the music saying "There's something about the way Danny Boyle uses popular music in his films that's really exciting for anyone who genuinely cares about the medium. Plenty of directors are good with a score, and he's no slouch in that department, but the use of songs is a different beast. In both score and songs, Boyle seems to have an inherent ability to understand the moods and emotions music can inspire in people and uses it to augment his storytelling."

The soundtrack was rated five out of five in the review by Danny Graydon of Empire magazine. His review reads: "Following their Oscar-winning collaboration on Slumdog Millionaire, A. R. Rahman provides Danny Boyle’s tale of a mountaineer in dire straits with an affecting core of slow-burn, reflective cues that ultimately penetrate in a big way, supported by a typically eclectic array of exterior tracks from the likes of Free Blood, Bill Withers and, most effectively, Sigur Rós. Rahman’s nine cues are anchored on acoustic guitar and generate a suitably meditative tone, augmented by ethnic pipes (Acid Darbari) and ethereal vocals (R. I. P.). Rahman’s collaboration with singer Dido, If I Rise, closes proceedings with a cathartic and quietly optimistic tone which almost prompts a tear."

Margaret Wappler, in the review published in Los Angeles Times, said that "In his last movie, Slumdog Millionaire, director Danny Boyle showed a sophisticated sense of how music and image can intertwine and intensify each other. With his latest, 127 Hours, he proves his skill again, reenlisting composer A.R. Rahman, who won two Academy Awards for his racing, kinetic score to Boyle's violent fairy tale set in Mumbai, India."

Daniel Schweiger of Film Music Magazine said that "Danny Boyle and A.R. Rahman are going for a far more interior moment of transcendence, one that tells us the often-awful fight for life is more than worth it- especially in this haunting fever dream that take a filmmaker and musician to new heights while pondering their way out of a man's darkest hours."

The review published by Christian Clemmensen at Filmtracks commented that "Whether or not you can stomach this film or its equally challenging album, the music serves as even more evidence that the diversity of Rahman's talents can compete favourably in an otherwise arguably stale film scoring environment in the United States."

Jonathan Broxton of Movie Music UK gave a favourable review and called the score an "unconventional one". He also praised Rahman for his ability to score in multiple genres.

Director Shekhar Kapur, after a special screening of the movie, commented through Twitter that "Rahman's score adds depth to Danny Boyle's deft and energetic direction in 127 hours. Rahman certainly deserves another Oscar for 127 hours, Danny Boyle and Rahman are proving to be a great combination."

Aron Ralston, on whom the movie is based, praised Rahman for the music and posted a hand-written note on Facebook and Twitter, which reads:

Awards and nominations

 Nominated – Academy Award for Best Original Score
 Nominated – Academy Award for Best Original Song for "If I Rise"
 Nominated – Alliance of Women Film Journalists Award for Best Score
 Nominated – BAFTA Award for Best Film Music
 Won – Broadcast Film Critics Association Award for Best Song for "If I Rise"
 Nominated – Central Ohio Film Critics Association Award for Best Score
 Won – Denver Film Critics Society for Best Song for "If I Rise"
 Nominated – Golden Globe Award for Best Original Score
 Nominated – Houston Film Critics Society Award for Best Original Score
 Nominated – Houston Film Critics Society Award for Best Original Song for "If I Rise"
 Nominated – Las Vegas Film Critics Society Award for Best Song for "If I Rise"
 Nominated – San Diego Film Critics Society Award for Best Original Score
 Nominated – Satellite Award for Best Original Score
 Nominated – Satellite Award for Best Original Song for "If I Rise"
 Nominated – Washington D.C. Area Film Critics Association Award for Best Score
 Won – World Soundtrack Award – Public Choice (A. R. Rahman)
 Nominated – World Soundtrack Award for Best Original Song Written Directly for a Film for "If I Rise"

Track listing 

 Notes

Personnel 
 A. R. Rahman – harpejji
 Ranjit Barot – drums
 Sanjay Divecha – guitar
 Joel Shearer – guitar
 Karl Peters – bass guitar
 Pete Lockett – percussion

References

External links 
 
 "127 HOURS: Awards and Nominations so far"

2010 soundtrack albums
Ambient soundtracks
Industrial soundtracks
Experimental music soundtracks
A. R. Rahman soundtracks
2010s film soundtrack albums